Richfield may refer to:

Places

Canada
Richfield, Edmonton, Alberta, a neighbourhood
Richfield, Nova Scotia
Richfield, British Columbia, a ghost town from the Cariboo Gold Rush

United States
Richfield, California
Richfield, Idaho
Richfield, Iowa
Richfield, Kansas
Richfield, Minnesota
Richfield, Nebraska
Richfield, New York
Richfield (hamlet), New York
Richfield, North Carolina
Richfield, Ohio
Richfield, Pennsylvania
Richfield, Utah
Richfield, Adams County, Wisconsin
Richfield, Washington County, Wisconsin
Richfield, Wood County, Wisconsin
Richfield Township (disambiguation)

People
Edwin Richfield, English actor

Other uses
Richfield Oil Corporation, a former brand of filling station in the western United States that merged to form the Atlantic Richfield Company (ARCO)

See also
Richfield High School (disambiguation)